Matias Mariani is a Brazilian film director, screenwriter, and producer. He is best known for his work on the film Shine Your Eyes and documentary I Touched All Your Stuff.

Life and career 
Matias graduated from New York University Tisch School Of  the Arts. In 2006, he co-founded the production company Primo Filmes. In 2014, he directed the documentary feature I Touched All Your Stuff, premiered at Marseille Festival of Documentary Film and Rio de Janeiro International Film Festival and it was released theatrically both in the US and Brazil. In 2020, his debut feature film Shine Your Eyes, premiered at the Panorama portion of the 70th Berlin International Film Festival and released on Netflix on July 29, 2020.

Filmography

References

External links 
 

Living people
Brazilian film directors
Brazilian screenwriters
Brazilian film producers
Year of birth missing (living people)